The Real Casa de la Aduana (Spanish: Real Casa de la Aduana means royal customs house) is the headquarters of Spain's Ministry of Economy and Ministry of the Treasury.
It is located on Madrid's longest street, the Calle de Alcalá.

The eighteenth-century building has been modified over the years. It was declared Bien de Interés Cultural in 1998.

References 

Buildings and structures in Sol neighborhood, Madrid
Custom houses
Bien de Interés Cultural landmarks in Madrid
Calle de Alcalá